Konerirajapuram is a village in the Mayiladuthurai taluk of Mayiladuthurai district, Tamil Nadu, India. It is famous for the Uma Maheswarar Temple. It was also known as Thirunallam.

Demographics 

 census, Konerirajapuram had a total population of 4658. The sex ratio was 932. The literacy rate was 71.

Konerirajapuram is 22 km away from Kumbakonam by road. It is approximately 5 km towards the south from S. Pudur on the Kumbakonam — Karaikkal road. It is famous for its Shiva temple which also has a bronze statue of Lord Natraja.

References 

 

Villages in Mayiladuthurai district